Nabukjuak Bay is an arm of the Foxe Basin in the Qikiqtaaluk Region of Nunavut, Canada. It is located on the northeastern Foxe Peninsula, in western Baffin Island. Low and flat land characteristics proceed in a southeast direction from the bay.

References

Bays of Foxe Basin